Emperor Min of Jin (300 – February 7, 318), personal name Sima Ye (司馬鄴 or 司馬業), courtesy name Yanqi (彥旗), was an emperor of the Jin Dynasty (266–420) and the last of the Western Jin.

Emperor Min surrendered in 316 to Liu Yao, a general of the Xiongnu state Han Zhao, and was later executed by Liu Cong, the emperor of Han Zhao, in 318 – like his uncle Emperor Huai had been in 313.

Prior to becoming emperor 
Sima Ye was a son of Sima Yan (司馬晏) the Prince of Wu, a son of Jin's founding emperor Emperor Wu, and Lady Xun, a daughter of Xun Xu. However, he was posthumously adopted by his uncle Sima Jian (司馬柬) the Prince of Qin, who died in 291, nine years before his birth, and so he inherited the title of Prince of Qin.

When the Jin capital Luoyang fell to Han Zhao forces in 311, Prince Ye's uncle Emperor Huai was captured, and his father Prince Yan was killed.  Prince Ye himself, at age 13, was able to escape from Han Zhao forces, and he got to Mi (密縣, in modern Zhengzhou, Henan) when he encountered his uncles, the Jin officials Xun Fan (荀藩) and Xun Zu (荀組), who decided to support him as their leader.  Later that year, the general Yan Ding tried to escort Prince Ye into the Guanzhong region (modern central Shaanxi), where he thought the central government could be rebuilt, but on the way, most of the supporters and troops deserted them—including Prince Ye's uncles.  Eventually, however, Yan and Prince Ye were able to arrive in Guanzhong.  They were supported by the general Jia Ya, and Jia was able to capture Chang'an in 312, allowing Prince Ye to enter and set up his headquarters there.  In fall 312, Jia and Yan offered Prince Ye the title of crown prince, and they then organized a provisional government.

Reign 
In spring 313, the captured Emperor Huai was executed by the Han Zhao emperor Liu Cong.  The news, however, took three months to get to Chang'an.  Once it did, Crown Prince Ye held an official mourning for his uncle and then ascended the throne as Emperor Min.  At that time, the city of Chang'an was so poor that it had less than a hundred households, and there were only four wagons available.  The officials lacked official uniforms and seals.  The military matters were largely entrusted to the generals Qu Yun and Suo Chen.  Emperor Min issued an edict ordering Sima Bao, the Prince of Nanyang, who still had a sizable force in Qin Province (秦州, modern eastern Gansu), and Sima Rui, the Prince of Langya, who held large portions of territory near and south of the Yangtze River, to come to his aid, but both Sima Bao and Sima Rui only paid nominal allegiance to him and failed to actually provide any assistance.  Around the new year of 314, Han Zhao made a surprise attack on Chang'an, and while that attack was thwarted that time, it showed that the Jin regime under Emperor Min lacked the power to defend itself.  Only Zhang Gui, the governor of Liang Province (涼州, modern central and western Gansu), sent small detachments and supplies periodically to Chang'an.  In 315, Sima Bao considered coming to Emperor Min's aid, but ultimately did not do so, and Suo subsequently refused a plan to send the emperor to Sima Bao, reasoning that Sima Bao would then use the emperor as a puppet.

In fall 316, the Han Zhao general Liu Yao, the Prince of Zhongshan, made a major attack against Emperor Min's territory. After he captured the Beidi Commandery (北地, roughly modern Tongchuan, Shaanxi), the other Jin cities in Guanzhong collapsed. Two relief forces arrived but were hesitant to engage Liu Yao. Liu Yao therefore was able to besiege Chang'an, and after the food supply ran out, Emperor Min resolved to surrender.  He was delivered by Liu Yao to the Han Zhao capital Pingyang (平陽, in modern Linfen, Shanxi).

After capture by Han Zhao 
Liu Cong initially created the former Jin emperor the Marquess of Huai'an. In early 318, at a feast, he had the marquess serve as butler, and a number of former Jin officials could not control themselves and cried out loud at their former emperor's humiliation. Furthermore, around this time, there were a number of uprisings against Han Zhao, each claiming to want to capture Han Zhao's crown prince Liu Can to exchange him for the former Jin emperor. Liu Can therefore recommended that Sima Ye be executed, and Liu Cong agreed, executing him after receiving Liu Can's report.

Era name 
Jianxing (建興 Jiànxīng) 313–317

Ancestry

References

300 births
318 deaths
Jin dynasty (266–420) emperors
Executed Former Zhao people
4th-century Chinese monarchs
Monarchs taken prisoner in wartime
Murdered Chinese emperors
4th-century executions
People executed by Former Zhao
Heads of government who were later imprisoned